The 15th Marine Regiment (15th Marines) is an inactive United States Marine Corps infantry and later artillery regiment.

History

Infantry regiment
The 15th Marines was first organized on November 26, 1918, as an infantry regiment. It was deployed to the Dominican Republic on February 26, 1919, and saw action against Dominican rebels during the American occupation of the Dominican Republic. Having been organized for possible deployment to Europe in the event that hostilities resumed, the 15th Marines remained on garrison duty in the Dominican Republic.  It was deactivated on August 1, 1922 and its assets were absorbed into the 1st and 4th Regiments.

Artillery regiment

The 15th Marines was reactivated as an artillery regiment on October 23, 1944, on Guadalcanal, and assigned to the 6th Marine Division. It was formed by combining Pack Howitzer Battalions from the 4th, 22nd, and the 29th Marines. They were redesignated 1st, 2nd and 3rd Battalions, respectively. The 4th Battalion was activated on November 14, 1944. The regiment saw heavy action fighting on Okinawa and the 6th Division received the Presidential Unit Citation for their actions during the battle.

The Regiment was withdrawn from Okinawa after it was declared secure in July 1945 and was redeployed to Guam to prepare for the invasion of Japan.  After the surrender of the Japanese, the Regiment was sent to Tsingtao, China to accept the surrender of the Japanese in that area. The 15th Marines remained in China until its deactivation on March 26, 1946.

Organization

Notable former members
 Harold Gonsalves - posthumous recipient of the Medal of Honor for actions during the Battle of Okinawa.

See also
 6th Marine Division
 6th Marine Division on Okinawa
 Organization of the United States Marine Corps
 List of United States Marine Corps regiments

Citations

References

Bibliography
 
 Gordon L. Rottman, US Marine Corps Pacific Theater of Operations 1944-45, Osprey Publishing, Oxford, 2004.

Web
 15th Marine Regiment History (Archived 2014-12-31)

015
Artillery
Inactive units of the United States Marine Corps
United States Marine Corps in World War II
Military units and formations established in 1918
Military units and formations disestablished in 1922
Military units and formations established in 1944
Military units and formations disestablished in 1946
1918 establishments in the United States
1946 disestablishments in China